Robert Olaf Waring (November 26, 1919 – June 16, 1976) was a U.S. diplomat assassinated in Beirut, Lebanon in 1976.

Early life
Waring was born in Long Island City, New York on November 26, 1919, and attended Fordham University, where he graduated with a Bachelor of Arts and Masters of Arts degree. During World War II, he served two years at the War Department from 1943 until 1944. In the latter year, he joined State Department as a clerk.

Diplomatic career
He served in administrative posts as a Foreign Service officer in various locations including Casablanca, Rabat, Thessaloniki, Athens, West Berlin and London. He then became an Economic Officer and served in Vienna from 1961 to 1966 and then in Berlin until 1971, when he returned to Washington, D.C. In June 1972, he and his family were posted to Beirut, Lebanon, where he had good business and political contacts including the future president, Elias Sarkis.

Death
At 10h40 on 16 June 1976, in Beirut, Francis E. Meloy, Jr., the incoming U.S. Ambassador to Lebanon, accompanied by Waring, the U.S. Economic Counselor, were on their way to present Meloy's credentials to the new Lebanese President-elect Elias Sarkis. Meloy, Waring and their driver, Zuhair Mohammed Moghrabi, were kidnapped by Popular Front for the Liberation of Palestine members as they crossed the Green Line, the division between Beirut's Christian and Muslim sectors. Meloy had been in the country a month, but not presented his credentials to the old president Suleiman Franjieh who had taken refuge outside Beirut and refused to step down.
By 21h30, Lebanese television announced their bullet-riddled bodies had been found on a garbage dump near the beach in Ramlet al-Baida. He was survived by his wife Irene Pollack and four children.

See also
List of kidnappings
List of solved missing person cases

References

External links
Arlington National Cemetery
Presidential Proclamation honoring Ambassador Meloy & Counselor Waring

1919 births
1970s missing person cases
1976 murders in Lebanon
1976 deaths
American expatriates in Germany
American expatriates in Greece
American expatriates in Lebanon
American expatriates in the United Kingdom
American people murdered abroad
American terrorism victims
Assassinated American diplomats
Deaths by firearm in Lebanon
Fordham University alumni
Formerly missing people
Kidnapped American people
Kidnapped diplomats